Benjamin Garré (born 11 July 2000) is an Argentine professional footballer who plays as a left winger for Krylia Sovetov Samara.

Club career
Garré is a graduate of the club Club Atlético Vélez Sarsfield. In June 2016, he signed with English club Manchester City. To get game practice, he played for the Citizens youth team (61 matches and 14 goals), including in the UEFA Youth League. Before the start of the 2018–19 season, he went on a pre-season tour of the United States with Manchester City and, as part of the 2018 International Champions Cup, played his first match for the main team against Borussia Dortmund (1–0 loss) - replacing Phil Foden in the 73rd minute. He also came on as a substitute in matches against Liverpool (2–1 loss) and Bayern Munich (3–2 win).

At the beginning of 2020, Garré returned to his homeland, signing a contract with Racing Club de Avellaneda. On 28 February, in a match against Newell's Old Boys, he made his debut in the Argentine Primera División. On 24 September, in the 2020 Copa Libertadores match against the Peruvian Club Alianza Lima, he scored his first goal for Racing.

In 2021, a left knee injury took him out of the game for seven months and forced him to start over.

In the summer of 2022, Garré moved to Club Atlético Huracán on loan. On 11 June, in a match against Rosario Central, he made his debut for a new team. On 25 July, in a duel against Club Atlético Colón, he scored his first goal for Huracan.

In January 2023, Garré moved to the Russian club Krylia Sovetov Samara, signing a contract for 3.5 years. The transfer amount was €1.75 million. He became the second Argentine player in the history of the club - after Gustavo Lillo.

International career
In 2015, Garré became the bronze medalist of the 2015 South American Championship under the age of 15.

In 2017, he took part in the 2017 South American U-17 Championship in Chile. At the tournament, he played in matches against the national teams of Venezuela (1–0), Paraguay (1–0), Peru (3–0 win) and Brazil (2–0 loss).

Personal life
Benjamin Garre was born on 11 July 2000 in Buenos Aires. At the age of 5, Jacqueline's mother took him to the «Villarreal-Versailles» club because he played football at home 24 hours a day, endangering his house. Soon they begin to notice him and at the age of 7 he moves to the «Club Atlético Vélez Sarsfield» club, where he remained until 2016.

His grandfather, Oscar Garré, was the 1986 FIFA World Cup champion. All his male relatives (with the exception of the middle son Oscar) played for «Huracan» in different years: father (Oscar's youngest son) — Emiliano Garré, two uncles — Ezequiel Garré (Oscar's eldest son) and Leonardo Ariel Orsi (godfather and brother his mother Jacqueline).

On 9 January 2023, Garre married model Luana Malfitano, and a year earlier, in February 2022, they had a daughter, Amira.

Career statistics

Honours 
Argentina U15
 South American U-15 Championship Bronze: 2015

References

External links

2000 births
Living people
Footballers from Buenos Aires
Argentine footballers
Argentine expatriate footballers
Argentina youth international footballers
Argentina under-20 international footballers
Association football wingers
Argentine Primera División players
Russian Premier League players
Racing Club de Avellaneda footballers
Club Atlético Huracán footballers
PFC Krylia Sovetov Samara players
Argentine expatriate sportspeople in England
Expatriate footballers in England
Argentine expatriate sportspeople in Russia
Expatriate footballers in Russia